Khusrau Shah (also spelled Khosrau Shah, Khosrow Shah, and Khusraw Shah) was the last king of the Justanids from 972 to ca. 1004. He was the son and successor of Manadhar.

The words "Khosrow" and "Shah" are both Persian words that mean "king".

Reign
During the reign of Khusrau Shah, relations between the Buyids flourished; he aided the Buyid ruler Adud al-Dawla in his campaigns by reinforcing him with Daylamite troops. Even during a period when Khusrau Shah was sick, Adud al-Dawla sent one of his physicians named Jibrail III to treat him. Fanna Khusraw (Adud al-Dawla) married the sister of Khusrau Shah, who bore him Taj al-Dawla (Abu'l-Husain Ahmad) and Diya' al-Dawla (Abu Tahir Firuzshah). Khusrau Shah's brother Fuladh ibn Manadhar was a prominent Buyid officer who held much influence in the Buyid court of Baghdad. Khusrau Shah later died ca. in 1004; the name of his successor is unknown, however, the dynasty continued to rule in Rudbar until the late 11th-century.

References

Sources
 

 

1004 deaths
10th-century Iranian people
11th-century Iranian people
10th-century rulers in Asia
Justanids
Year of birth unknown